The 1932 German football championship, the 25th edition of the competition, ended with the first national title for FC Bayern Munich. The title was won with a 2–0 over Eintracht Frankfurt. It was a replay of the Southern German championship final, in which Eintracht had defeated Bayern 2–0 on 24 April 1932.

For both clubs it was their first appearance in the German final. While Bayern, the winner, never appeared in another one, Eintracht made up for the 1932 loss by winning the 1959 final.

To qualify for the national championship, a team needed to win or finish runners-up in one of the seven regional championships. On top of those 14 clubs, the two strongest regions, West and South were allowed to send a third team each. In the West, this was the local cup winner while in the South, the third placed team of the championship received this place.

Qualified teams
The teams qualified through the regional championships:

Competition

Round of 16

Quarter-finals

Semi-finals

Final

Top goalscorers
The top scorer of the competition:

References

Sources
 Süddeutschlands Fussball in Tabellenform 1897 - 1988, by Ludolf Hyll, page 96 - German championship 1932
 kicker Allmanach 1990, by kicker, page 164 & 177 - German championship

External links
 German Championship 1931–32 at weltfussball.de 
 German Championship 1932 at RSSSF

 

1
German
German football championship seasons